The 1990 Campeonato Nacional, was the 58th season of top-flight football in Chile. Colo-Colo won its seventeenth title. Deportes Concepción, as Liguilla winners, also qualified for the next Copa Libertadores .

League table

Results

Top goalscorers

Source

Title

Liguilla Pre-Copa Libertadores

Deportes Concepción also qualified for the 1991 Copa Libertadores

Promotion/relegation Liguilla

Everton and Deportes Antofagasta (after Naval was dissolved); will play in the 1991 Primera División

See also
1990 Copa Apertura

References

Sources
RSSSF Page

Primera División de Chile seasons
Chile
Primera